The Allegheny Furnace is an historic iron furnace, which is located in Altoona, Blair County, Pennsylvania, USA. 

It was added to the National Register of Historic Places in 1991.

History
The furnace was built in 1811, with alterations and upgrades added in 1847 and 1852. The furnace went out of blast in 1817 and was not revived until 1835. It used charcoal as fuel until it was converted to coke in the 1860s. It permanently closed down in the 1870s.

It was added to the National Register of Historic Places in 1991.

References

External links

Buildings and structures in Altoona, Pennsylvania
Industrial buildings and structures on the National Register of Historic Places in Pennsylvania
Industrial buildings completed in 1811
Historic American Engineering Record in Pennsylvania
National Register of Historic Places in Blair County, Pennsylvania